Nevada Bell Telephone Company, originally Bell Telephone Company of Nevada, is a Nevada telephone provider and it was the Bell System's telephone provider in Nevada. It only provides telephone services to 30% of the state, essentially all of the state outside Las Vegas, where service is provided by CenturyLink. Nevada Bell spent nearly all of its history as a subsidiary of Pacific Bell, which is the reason Nevada Bell was not listed in Judge Harold Greene's Modification of Final Judgment, starting the breakup of AT&T.

History
Nevada Bell traces its history to 1906, when Pacific Telephone and Telegraph forerunner of Pacific Bell bought the Sunset Telephone and Telegraph Company, one of several early telephone companies in Nevada.  In 1913, Pacific Telephone transferred its Nevada operations to the newly formed Bell Telephone Company of Nevada.  After the 1984 breakup, its legal name was shortened to Nevada Bell (its popular name for the better part of its history), and it became an operating company of Pacific Telesis alongside Pacific Bell.

Mergers
In 1997, Pacific Telesis Group was acquired by SBC Communications. Although the Pacific Telesis corporate name disappeared fairly quickly, SBC continued to operate the local telephone companies separately under their original names.

In September 2001, SBC rebranded the telephone company "SBC Nevada Bell".  In late 2002, the Nevada Bell name disappeared altogether when SBC rebranded all of its operating companies as simply "SBC."  Meanwhile, employees of SBC working in Nevada who support SBC's non-regulated services and/or services provided both within and outside Nevada were transferred to other SBC subsidiaries, like "Pacific Telesis Shared Services" and "SBC Operations, Inc."  However, for legal and regulatory purposes, employees supporting local regulated services were still employed by "Nevada Bell dba SBC Nevada", which was the SBC subsidiary that provided regulated local telephone services within the franchise territory in Nevada.

On November 18, 2005, SBC completed its acquisition of AT&T Corp. to form AT&T Inc., at which point Nevada Bell began doing business as AT&T Nevada.

References

AT&T subsidiaries
Bell System
Companies based in Reno, Nevada
Communications in Nevada
Defunct telecommunications companies of the United States
1913 establishments in Nevada
Telecommunications companies established in 1913
American companies established in 1913